This article lists the presidents of Myanmar (also known as Burma) since the Burmese Declaration of Independence in 1948.

Titles
 1948–1962: President of the Union of Burma
 1962–1974: Chairman of the Union Revolutionary Council
 1974–1988: President of the Socialist Republic of the Union of Burma
 1988–1997: Chairman of the State Law and Order Restoration Council 
 1997–2011: Chairman of the State Peace and Development Council
 2011–present: President of the Republic of the Union of Myanmar

Presidents of Burma / Myanmar (1948–present)

(Dates in italics indicate de facto continuation of office)

Timeline

See also
 Myanmar
 Politics of Myanmar
 List of colonial governors of Burma
 List of premiers of British Burma
 President of Myanmar
 Vice-President of Myanmar
 Prime Minister of Myanmar
 List of prime ministers of Myanmar
 Deputy Prime Minister of Myanmar
 State Counsellor of Myanmar
 Chairman of the State Administration Council
 Lists of office-holders

Notes

References

External links
 World Statesmen – Myanmar (Burma)
  Myanmar (Burmese) New Government Cabinet

Myanmar
Presidents

zh:缅甸总统#缅甸总统列表（1948年至今）